Gary Gudgeon  is an Australian Paralympic swimmer.  At the 1980 Arnhem Games, he won a gold medal in the Men's 400 m Freestyle C–D event, two silver medals in the Men's 100 m Backstroke C–D and Men's 4x50 m Individual Medley C events, and a bronze medal in the Men's 100 m Freestyle C–D event. At the 1984 New York/Stoke Mandeville Games, he won four gold medals in the Men's 100 m Breaststroke A4, Men's 100 m Butterfly A4, Men's 200 m Individual Medley A4 and Men's 400 m Freestyle A4 events, and a silver medal in the Men's 100 m Backstroke A4 event.

References

Male Paralympic swimmers of Australia
Swimmers at the 1980 Summer Paralympics
Swimmers at the 1984 Summer Paralympics
Paralympic gold medalists for Australia
Paralympic silver medalists for Australia
Paralympic bronze medalists for Australia
Living people
Medalists at the 1980 Summer Paralympics
Medalists at the 1984 Summer Paralympics
Year of birth missing (living people)
Paralympic medalists in swimming
Australian male freestyle swimmers
Australian male backstroke swimmers
Australian male butterfly swimmers
Australian male breaststroke swimmers
Australian male medley swimmers
20th-century Australian people